Ariosoma shiroanago is an eel in the family Congridae (conger/garden eels). It was described by Hirotoshi Asano in 1958, originally under the genus Alloconger. It is a marine, temperate water-dwelling eel which is known from the northwestern Pacific Ocean, including Japan, South Korea, and Taiwan. It leads a benthic lifestyle and inhabits rough sand on continental shelves. Males can reach a maximum total length of 40 centimetres.

References

shiroanago
Taxa named by Hirotoshi Asano
Fish described in 1958